Three Blind Mice is a children's nursery rhyme and musical round. The title may also refer to:

Film and television
 Three Blind Mice (1938 film), romantic comedy starring Loretta Young, Joel McCrea and David Niven
 Three Blind Mice (2001 film), TV movie starring Brian Dennehy
 Three Blind Mice (2003 film), crime thriller with Edward Furlong
 Three Blind Mice (2008 film), Australian film written and directed by Matthew Newton
 Three Blind Mice, working title of The Final Terror, a 1983 horror film
 Three Blind Mice (Shrek), in the Shrek movie franchise

Music
 Three Blind Mice (album), by Art Blakey & the Jazz Messengers in 1962
 "Three Blind Mice" (instrumental), working title for a studio experiment recorded by Brian Wilson of The Beach Boys
 Three Blind Mice (record label), jazz label in Japan
 3 Kings (jazz trio), also known as the Three Blind Mice

Other
 Three Blind Mice (radio play and short story), by Agatha Christie
 Three Blind Mice and Other Stories, a book of short stories by Agatha Christie
 Three Blind Mice: How the TV Networks Lost Their Way a book by Ken Auletta
 Variant of a solitaire game of cards